Hugh Marion Gillis (September 6, 1918 – January 1, 2013) was an American politician.

Early life and education
Born in Soperton, Georgia, Gillis was a farmer and timber grower. He graduated from University of Georgia with a degree in agriculture.

Political career
Gilles served as a Democrat in the Georgia House of Representatives for twelve years and then the Georgia State Senate from 1962 to 2004 before retiring. He died in Vidalia, Georgia.

References

1918 births
2013 deaths
People from Soperton, Georgia
University of Georgia alumni
Democratic Party members of the Georgia House of Representatives
Democratic Party Georgia (U.S. state) state senators
People from Vidalia, Georgia
21st-century American politicians